Yermakovsky District is an administrative and municipal district (raion), one of the forty-three in Krasnoyarsk Krai, Russia. It is located in the south of the krai and borders with Karatuzsky District in the northeast, the Tuva Republic in the east and south, and with Shushensky District in the west and northwest. Its administrative center is the rural locality (a selo) of Yermakovskoye. Population:  23,202 (2002 Census);  The population of Yermakovskoye accounts for 40.9% of the district's total population.

Geography
Most of the district's territory is located in the center of the Western Sayan Mountains.

History
The district was founded on May 25, 1925.

Government
As of 2015, the Head of the District is Mikhail A. Vigovsky. As of 2016, the District Council consists of twenty-one deputies.

References

Notes

Sources

Districts of Krasnoyarsk Krai
States and territories established in 1925